RMIT's School of Management is an Australian tertiary education school within the College of Business at the Royal Melbourne Institute of Technology (RMIT University), located in Melbourne, Victoria.

It is one of the best business schools in Australia, for students' satisfaction, staff-student ration and research and publication from the academic staff members.

See also
RMIT University

References

External links
School of Management

Management
Business schools in Australia